Denis Coulson (born 13 June 1994) is an Irish rugby union player for Pro D2 side Carcassonne. He plays as a prop.

Early life
Born in Dublin, Coulson was part of the St Michael's College side that won the 2012 Leinster Schools Rugby Senior Cup.

Grenoble
Coulson represented Leinster in underage rugby, before accepting an academy contract with French club FC Grenoble in 2014, who were then coached by ex-Leinster player and former St Michael's College head coach Bernard Jackman. He made 39 appearances for the club over three seasons.

Connacht
In August 2017, Irish Pro14 side Connacht announced that they had signed Coulson ahead of the 2017–2018 season. Coulson is an ex-Ireland U20 international.

References

External links
Profile on itsrugby

Living people
1994 births
People educated at St Michael's College, Dublin
Irish rugby union players
Rugby union props
FC Grenoble players
Connacht Rugby players
Rugby union players from Dublin (city)
Stade Français players
US Carcassonne players
Expatriate rugby union players in France
Irish expatriate sportspeople in France
Irish expatriate rugby union players